The Rutgers University Police Department (RUPD) is a campus police agency responsible for law enforcement on the New Brunswick, Newark, and Camden campuses of Rutgers University.  RUPD is a department of the university's Division of Administration and Public Safety, overseen by Rutgers Institutional Planning and Operations (IP&O) which also houses Rutgers University Emergency Services (RUES) which is responsible for Emergency Medical Services and emergency management on the campus as well as responding to fire and hazardous materials emergencies in coordination with local first responders. The Division of Administration and Public Safety also oversees the campus bus system, the Rutgers Golf Course, and other services on campus.

RUPD is a fully empowered law enforcement entity under state law with state-wide jurisdiction. Its jurisdiction is shared with local police departments, such as the New Brunswick Police Dept and the Middlesex County Sheriff's Office, and the New Jersey State Police. RUPD works closely with these agencies as well as neighboring police departments and the adjacent campus police departments of UMDNJ in Newark and New Brunswick, NJIT and Essex County College in Newark, and Rowan University and Camden County College in Camden.

RUPD staff includes fully trained, commissioned, and armed Police Officers as well as Security Officers, 911 Dispatchers, and student Community Service Officers. Rutgers Emergency Services staff includes trained firefighters, incident managers, emergency medical technicians, hazardous materials technicians, and instructors who are on duty 24 hours a day seven days a week.

Locations
Camden
Administrative Services Building
Newark
RUPD Newark Headquarters (Parking Deck 1)
One Washington Park Police Substation (Rutgers Business School)
The University Hospital

New Brunswick
Public Safety Building
Cook Campus Police Substation

Community Service Officer Program
RUPD employs part-time community service officers. CSOs are required to be full-time students at Rutgers University and are assigned to either the Newark or New Brunswick division. CSOs report directly to RUPD Security Services, as well as have their own internal ranking hierarchy. A Security Lieutenant oversees each campus division. CSOs effectively function as Security Officers and are non-sworn, unarmed employees of RUPD and Rutgers University. Responsibilities include stadium traffic control, bag checks, foot patrols, mounted patrols, vehicle patrols, operation of the Knight Mover shuttle, and event security. The program is the only one of its kind in the country with its own horse-mounted patrol run by university students. The horses live and are cared for at Rutgers Farms on Cook/Douglass campus. The program's purpose is to provide employment opportunities and give exposure to the law enforcement field.

A smaller, separate program for Rutgers University Emergency Services (RUES) is also offered to students, allowing full-time students to become part-time Emergency Service Officers (ESO). ESOs focus on fire prevention and medical issues rather than law enforcement.

Notable incidents
On April 13, 2013 RUPD officers responded alongside officers from the New Brunswick PD and UMDNJ Police to quell the riot that had grown out of the annual Delafest celebration, resulting in four arrests for aggravated assault on police, unlawful possession of a weapon, and underage consumption of alcohol.
On April 3, 2013, Rutgers Police and Security Officers, the Newark Police Department, and Newark Fire Department responded to a dumpster fire at One Washington Park that extended to offices in the business school and caused the cancellation of classes.
Rutgers Police and the FBI arrested sophomore Elan Haba on February 8, 2012 for possession of explosive materials in his dorm on the Newark campus.
Rutgers Police and New Brunswick Police have overlapping jurisdiction which has caused issues in the past.

References

External links

University and college police forces of the United States
Police
School police departments of New Jersey